Madhuca barbata is a plant in the family Sapotaceae. The specific epithet barbata means "bearded", referring to the sepals.

Description
Madhuca barbata grows as a small tree. Inflorescences bear up to 12 flowers.

Distribution and habitat
Madhuca barbata is endemic to Borneo. Its habitat is peat swamp and mixed dipterocarp forests to  altitude.

Conservation
Madhuca barbata has been assessed as near threatened on the IUCN Red List. The species is threatened by conversion of land for palm oil plantations.

References

barbata
Endemic flora of Borneo
Plants described in 1991